Camber Sands is an EP released in 2002 by Fatboy Slim. It is the second in an EP series by Fatboy Slim and was named after the East Sussex beach of the same name.

The album's title track was originally the B-side to "Demons".

Track listing
 "Camber Sands" (Cook) - 6:05
 "Drop the Hate" (Santos Napalm Reprise) (Cook, Daniels) - 7:27
 "Song for Shelter" (Chemical Brothers mix) (Clark, Slim) - 7:02
 "Demons" (Stanton Warriors Dub) (Cook, Gray, Jackson, Withers) - 6:21
 "Retox" (Dave Clarke Mix) (Cook) - 5:22
 "Weapon of Choice" (Instrumental) (Cook, Collins, Slater) - 5:39

References 

2002 EPs
Fatboy Slim EPs